Srinivas University is a private university located in Mangalore, Karnataka, India. The university was established in 2015 by the A. Shama Rao Foundation through the Srinivas University Act, 2013. It is part of the Srinivas Group of Institutions.

References

External links

Universities in Mangalore
Educational institutions established in 2015
2015 establishments in Karnataka
Private universities in India